Gaming Instinct is a 2004 novel by the German writer Juli Zeh. The story is set in a private high school in Bonn, where an intellectual precocious girl and a classmate play a sexual prank on a teacher.

Reception
Die Zeit'''s reviewer placed the novel in a tradition of "German student tragedies" such as Frank Wedekind's Spring Awakening and Hermann Hesse's Beneath the Wheel. The critic compared the language to Robert Musil, and wrote: "It is astonishing, it is admirable, how the only 30-year-old writer, with a well-trained language for all horses and a highly educated ingenuity, races her story through more than 500 pages across the finish line, a story, which couldn't have been more uneasy. Uwe Wittstock of Die Welt'' found the novel tiresome and unoriginal. He compared its ideas to "commercial reports about the 'youth of today'", and wrote that "at the same time the novel's motif of 'blackmail with compromising photos' strikes me as about as corny as that of the forged letters in novels and plays from the 18th century." The novel received the Per Olov Enquist Award and the Prix Cévennes for Best European Novel.

See also
 2004 in literature
 German literature

References

External links
 Gaming Instinct at the publisher's website

2004 German novels
German-language novels
Novels by Juli Zeh
Novels set in Germany
Bonn
Novels set in high schools and secondary schools